Kalpana Rai (9 May 1950 – 6 February 2008) was an Indian actress from Andhra Pradesh who predominantly appeared in Telugu films. She acted in more than 430 films.
She was born in Kakinada.

Personal life 
Kalpana Rai was born in Kakinada. She had experience in stage, through which she entered into films. Though she acted in more than 400 films she died poor.

Career
She made her debut as an actress with the film O Seeta Katha in 1974. She was known for comical roles with peculiar dialect of Godavari districts. Her last film was Soggadu (2005).

Notable filmography

Death
She died because of her illness at her residence  in Indiranagar, Hyderabad. Even though she acted in more than 400 films she could not save much. Movie Artistes’ Association donated Rs.10,000 for her funeral and there were hardly any visitors to pay their last respects.

References

External links

2008 deaths
Telugu actresses
Actresses in Telugu cinema
Indian film actresses
People from Kakinada
Actresses from Andhra Pradesh
20th-century Indian actresses
21st-century Indian actresses
Actresses in Telugu theatre
Indian stage actresses
1950 births